Karamata may refer to:

Jovan Karamata (1902–1967), Serbian mathematician 
Karamata's inequality, named after Jovan Karamata, also known as the majorization inequality, a theorem in elementary algebra for convex and concave real-valued functions, defined on an interval of the real line. It generalizes the discrete form of Jensen's inequality
Karamata Family House, a cultural monument in Belgrade, Serbia

See also
Kalamata, a city in southern Greece
Kalamata (disambiguation)

Serbian surnames